Kristin Lund may refer to:

 Kristin Lund (general) (born 1958), general in the Norwegian Army
 Kristin Skogen Lund (born 1966), director general of the Confederation of Norwegian Enterprise